Head for the Door is the third studio album by American rock band The Exies. It was released on November 30, 2004.

"Ugly" would prove to be the album's first single and found notable airplay upon release. The song's chorus utilizes an easily recognizable power chord structure and was also used as the theme song for WWE Survivor Series 2004.

"Hey You" was included as a cover by WaveGroup Sound in the first two Guitar Hero games (the latter as DLC) and would later appear as a master recording in Guitar Hero Smash Hits.

"Slow Drain" was featured in NFL Street 2.

"What You Deserve" is included in the soundtrack of Juiced.

Track listing 

 All songs composed by The Exies, except track 10, which is composed by The Exies and Nick Raskulinecz.

Personnel
 Musical
 Scott Stevens – vocals, guitar
 David Walsh – guitar
 Freddy Herrera – bass guitar
 Dennis Wolfe – drums

 Technical
 Nick Raskulinecz – producer, engineer
 Matt Serletic – executive producer
 Christopher Wade Damerst – programming, loops
 Dean Serletic – A&R
 Mike Terry – engineer, digital editing
 Travis Huff – engineer
 Bob Ludwig – mastering
 Joe Barresi – mixing
 Chris Lord-Alge – mixing
 Randy Staub – mixing
 Bobby Schneck – guitar technician
 John Nicholson – drum technician
 Andrew Alekel – assistant
 Keith Armstrong – assistant
 Paul Figueroa – assistant
 June Murakawa – assistant
 German Villacorta – assistant
 Liza Lowinger – art coordinator
 Jeff Garner – photography 
 Chapman Baehler – photography 
 Alastair Thain – cover photo
 P. R. Brown – package design

References

2004 albums
The Exies albums
Virgin Records albums
Albums produced by Nick Raskulinecz